Thomas Wilson (1726-22 September 1799) was an Irish academic and clergyman most of whose career was spent at Trinity College Dublin (TCD), where he served as the fifth Erasmus Smith's Professor of Natural and Experimental Philosophy (1769-1786).

Life and career
Thomas Wilson was born in Donegal, son of the Rev John Wilson. He was educated at TCD, where he was a Scholar (1746) and was in the same class as Oliver Goldsmith.  He obtained BA (1848), MA (1853), BD (1758), DD (1864), and was elected a Fellow (1853), and later, Senior Fellow.   He was Erasmus Smith's Professor of Natural and Experimental Philosophy (1769-1786), and was appointed Archbishop King's Lecturer in Divinity (1785).  He resigned from TCD in 1786 to become Rector of Ardstraw, Tyrone.

References

Academics of Trinity College Dublin
Alumni of Trinity College Dublin
Classical scholars of Trinity College Dublin
Scholars of Trinity College Dublin
Fellows of Trinity College Dublin
Provosts of Trinity College Dublin
Donegall Lecturers of Mathematics at Trinity College Dublin
Irish mathematicians
People from County Donegal
1726 births
1799 deaths